Nicholas Schultz (born 13 September 1994) is an Australian professional road racing cyclist, who currently rides for UCI WorldTeam .

He was named in the startlist for the 2017 Vuelta a España.

Major results

2011
 1st  Time trial, Oceania Junior Road Championships
 2nd Trofeo Emilio Paganessi
 7th Trofeo comune di Vertova Memorial Pietro Merelli
2012
 3rd Road race, National Junior Road Championships
2015
 5th Road race, National Under-23 Road Championships
 7th Overall Tour de Gironde
2016
 1st Stage 7 Tour de l'Avenir
 2nd Overall Oberösterreich Rundfahrt
1st  Young rider classification
 7th Overall Ronde de l'Isard
 10th Overall Tour de Bretagne
1st Stage 7
 10th Overall Ronde de l'Oise
2017
 6th Klasika Primavera
 7th Overall Tour of Norway
2018
 3rd GP Miguel Induráin
 7th Klasika Primavera
2019
 2nd Overall Herald Sun Tour
1st Stage 4
 3rd Overall Settimana Internazionale di Coppi e Bartali
1st Stage 1b (TTT)
2021
 3rd Overall Settimana Internazionale di Coppi e Bartali
 4th Overall Czech Cycling Tour
1st Stage 2
 10th Overall Tour of the Alps

Grand Tour general classification results timeline

References

External links

1994 births
Living people
Australian male cyclists
Cyclists from Brisbane